Colias berylla, the Everest clouded yellow, is a small butterfly of the family Pieridae, that is, the yellows and whites, which is found in Sikkim (India) and Tibet.

Description
Greenish yellow in the male, with a moderately broad, yellow-spotted marginal band, black median spot on the forewing and a yellow one on the hindwing; hindwing darkened. Underside yellowish green, with black middle spot on forewing, a white one on hindwing, a band of yellow submarginal spots on both wings, and black submarginal spots on the posterior portion of the forewing. The females vary in ground colour from lemon-yellow to light orange, the hindwing being strongly darkened; the light submarginal spots rounded or elongate, often reaching to the margin; underside more strongly green, sometimes much darkened.

Subspecies
C. b. berylla
C. b. bergeriana Verhulst, 1992

See also
List of butterflies of India
List of butterflies of India (Pieridae)

References

External links
C. berylla images at Consortium for the Barcode of Life

berylla
Butterflies of Asia
Butterflies described in 1904